2022 Ukrainian counteroffensive may refer to:

 2022 Ukrainian eastern counteroffensive
 2022 Ukrainian southern counteroffensive

See also 
 List of military engagements during the 2022 Russian invasion of Ukraine